The CM-11 Brave Tiger is a main battle tank (MBT) that was developed by the American General Dynamics and the Republic of China Army Armored Vehicle Development Center. It was introduced to the public on 14 April 1990. The CM-11 is a hybrid M60 chassis fitted with the turret from the older M48 Patton and the fire control system of the M1 Abrams.

Development history 
The Republic of China (Taiwan) established the Armored Vehicle Development Center in 1980, and was tasked to develop military armored vehicles, and had cooperated with General Dynamics to develop the CM-11. The development of the tank has two main purposes, first was to avoid the limitations set by the US-PRC Joint Communique (17 August Communique), and second was to allow the ROCA to acquire second-generation MBTs.

The CM-11 is a hybrid tank using the M48A3 turret with the M60A3 tank hull, combined with the new M1 Abrams tank's fire control system (FCS). The United States designated it as M48H, where the "H" means Hybrid, and the Republic of China designated it CM-11 and named it Brave Tiger.

Design 
In 1988, two prototypes were finished and 450 CM-11 were ordered to built. The M60A3 hull was procured from the United States in 1987, and the M48A3 turret and the M68A1 105mm main cannon was produced by the Army Ordnance Maintenance and Development Center. The commander's turret was procured from Israel with an M2 Browning 12.7mm (.50 caliber) machine gun, the loader operates an M240 7.62mm machine gun, the coaxial machine gun is also an M240. Both sides of the turret have a M239 smoke grenade launcher mounted, like the M60A3 tank.

Advantages 
The greatest features and advantages of the CM-11 are that it has the same level of digital/analog hybrid ballistic calculator as the M1A1 Abrams; it has a two-dimensional sighting and gun stabilization system, more complete than the M60A3's one-dimensional stabilizing device; combining the AN/VSG-2 thermal imager, AN/VVS-2 Image Intensifier, AN/GVS-5 Nd-YAG laser rangefinder, allowing the CM-11 to have fire-on-the-move and night combat capabilities. It also has the highest probability of first-round hit compared to all other ROCA tanks.

Disadvantages 
Disadvantages of the CM-11 are its outdated design, armor, and gun.  The Chinese PLA's second-generation Type 96G tank and its third-generation Type 99 tank are both armed with a 125mm main cannon. The CM-11's armor does not offer significant protection against their 125mm APFSDS and HEAT shots. The ROCA knew this disadvantage very early, and tried to introduce explosive reactive armor (ERA) from the French company GIAT. However, the weight of the additional ERA installations caused excessive stress on the M60 chassis's torsion bar suspension, so plans to install ERA on the tanks was put on hold until a solution was found. The CM-11's 750 hp (560 kW) Continental AVDS-1790-2 V12, air-cooled twin-turbo diesel engine is 50-year-old technology as well, having been introduced in February 1963 with the first 600 U.S. Army converted M48A3s.

During the Spring Festival in 2012, the ROCA's 542 Armor Brigade of 6th Army Corps initiated their combat readiness drill, and showed a CM-11 installed with ERA for the first time. Developed by CSIST, angling was applied to the ERA design to reduce the probability of penetrating the hull.

Upgrade program

In 2017, Taiwan's Ministry of National Defence announced that it had allocated $6.6 million USD to develop upgrades for the country's 450 M60A3 TTS tanks. When the upgrade program was announced, the United Daily News reported that the CM-11 fleet would be upgraded after the M60A3 program.

See also 
 CM-12 Tank

References 

Post–Cold War main battle tanks
Armoured fighting vehicles of the Republic of China
Military vehicles introduced in the 1980s